Now He Sings, Now He Sobs is the second album by Chick Corea, released in December 1968 on Solid State Records. It features Corea in a trio with acoustic bassist Miroslav Vitouš and drummer Roy Haynes. It was later reissued on CD by Blue Note in 2002 with eight bonus tracks recorded at the same sessions.

All of the tracks on the original album are improvisations based on Corea’s ideas, with some being entirely free improvisations (such as "The Law of Falling and Catching Up" and "Fragments"). Vitous and Haynes would reunite with Corea as an acoustic trio on Trio Music (ECM, 1982), Trio Music, Live in Europe (ECM, 1986), and The Trio Live From The Country Club (Stretch, 1996).

The bonus tracks released on the CD include a cover of Thelonious Monk's composition "Pannonica" and the Wood/Mellin standard "My One and Only Love". All eight pieces had originally been issued in 1975 on Circling In, a Blue Note “twofer”.

In 1999, the single "Now He Sings, Now He Sobs" was given the Grammy Hall of Fame Award.

Reception 
The singer Bilal names it among his 25 favorite albums, explaining: "I think that's just one of the best jazz trio albums ever. Mostly every jazz musician I talk to love that album. It's just a classic."

Track listing 
All tracks are originals by the performers, except where noted.

Original release
"Steps - What Was" – 13:53
"Matrix" – 6:29
"Now He Sings, Now He Sobs" – 7:05
"Now He Beats the Drum, Now He Stops" – 10:40
"The Law of Falling and Catching Up" – 2:28

1988 CD release bonus tracks
"Samba Yantra" – 2:41
"Bossa" – 4:44
"I Don't Know" – 2:43
"Fragments" – 4:03
"Windows" – 3:12
"Gemini" – 4:23
"Pannonica" (Thelonious Monk) – 3:00
"My One and Only Love" (Guy Wood, Robert Mellin) – 3:34

Personnel 
 Chick Corea – piano
 Miroslav Vitouš – bass
 Roy Haynes – drums
 Sonny Lester – producer

See also 
 Trio Music (ECM, 1982)
 Trio Music Live in Europe (ECM, 1986)

References

External links 
 Chick Corea - Now He Sings, Now He Sobs (1968) album review by Stephen Thomas Erlewine, credits & releases at AllMusic
 Chick Corea - Now He Sings, Now He Sobs (1968) album releases & credits at Discogs
 Chick Corea - Now He Sings, Now He Sobs (1968) album to be listened as stream on Spotify

1968 albums
Chick Corea albums
Grammy Hall of Fame Award recipients
Solid State Records (jazz label) albums
Albums produced by Sonny Lester